Belfast is an unincorporated community in Lassen County, California.

The town was founded by Capt. Charles A. Merrill in 1880. The name reflects Capt. Merrill's hometown of Belfast, Maine.

References

Unincorporated communities in California
Unincorporated communities in Lassen County, California
Populated places established in 1880
1880 establishments in California